Setbacks is the debut studio album by American hip hop recording artist ScHoolboy Q, released for digital download on January 11, 2011 under Top Dawg Entertainment. The album features guest appearances from his fellow Black Hippy members Kendrick Lamar, Jay Rock and Ab-Soul, as well as vocals from singer-songwriters Alori Joh, Jhené Aiko and BJ the Chicago Kid. The album's production was handled by Lord Quest, Willie B, Focus..., Rahki, Phonix Beats, Tae Beast, DJ Wes, King Blue, Sounwave and more.

Schoolboy Q titled the album Setbacks, due to the limitations he experienced and endured before releasing the album. After the release of Setbacks, the album reached number 100 on the US Billboard 200, number 12 on the Top Rap Albums, number 25 on the Top R&B/Hip-Hop Albums and number 13 on the Top Independent Albums chart. Only a few weeks after Setbacks was released, it already had 4,395 units and was praised by fans and critics alike.

Background 
In 2012, in an interview with Complex, Schoolboy Q spoke on the concept behind Setbacks: "The concept behind Setbacks was [to talk about] all the shit that’s the reason why I can’t rap. The reason I can’t accomplish what I want to accomplish is because I’m doing all this dumb shit. I put it all together on the album. Like, ‘Druggys Wit Hoes,’ I'm out here drugging and I'm not even trying to fuck with hoes. ‘Kamikaze,’ I'm not even trying to rap—keep going broke. Different shit like that, I sum it up all in one album. My life did a whole 180 after that dropped. A lot of people still didn't know the name though, but a lot of people did. It was weird. It just took me to the right spot. I made some fucking money off the project, it helped me see that I needed to do more positive shit in life, and it made me into the person I am now. All I do now is just chill. I'd rather just chill, work on my music, be with my two-year-old daughter, and smoke weed and shit." Two weeks after the album's release ScHoolboy Q released it for free via his Twitter feed. The free version doesn't include "LigHt Years AHead" and is replaced with "Live Again" which also features Kendrick Lamar. The free version also features a new bonus track titled "Fuck Ya Hip Hop" featuring Big Pooh and Murs

Reception

Commercial performance 
The album debuted at number 100 on the US Billboard 200 chart and had sold 17,000 copies in the US as of February 2014.

Critical response 
Setbacks received generally positive reviews from music critics, who praised the album's production, features and lyrics. iHipHop gave it a 3.5 out of 5 rating mentioning "While Setbacks is a misleading title, ScHoolboy Q does leave room for critique. Despite his overwhelmingly impressive flow, Q rarely says anything worthy of raising an eyebrow." Allmusic gave it 4 out of 5 stars commenting "Dividing his time between socially conscious rap and bud smoker’s anthems, ScHoolboy Q makes quite the impression on his debut “street album"". They called Setbacks polished, funky, well-balanced, and rewarding.

Track listing

Charts

References

2011 debut albums
Schoolboy Q albums
Albums produced by Sounwave
Albums produced by Focus...
Albums produced by Tae Beast
Albums produced by Willie B
Top Dawg Entertainment albums